Adam Holland Acres (May 11, 1878 – April 20, 1955) was an Ontario politician. He was a Conservative and then Progressive Conservative member of the Legislative Assembly of Ontario from 1923 to 1948. He represented the riding of Carleton.

Background
He was born in March Township, Ontario, Carleton County, Ontario, the son of George H. Acres. In 1900, he married Almena Waterson. His farm was situated on Britannia Bay on the Ottawa River.

Politics
Acres served as reeve for the township from 1913 to 1916.

He was first elected to the Legislative Assembly of Ontario  as a Conservative Member of the Legislative Assembly (MLA) representing Carleton in 1923.

Acres was a candidate in the 1936 Conservative leadership convention placing sixth. He continued to sit in the legislature as a Tory backbencher until the 1948 Ontario election, when he retired from politics.

References 
 Canadian Parliamentary Guide, 1930, AL Normandin

External links 

1878 births
1955 deaths
Canadian people of English descent
Progressive Conservative Party of Ontario MPPs
Reeves of March Township